Dutch Leonard was the name of two Major League Baseball pitchers:

 Hubert "Dutch" Leonard (1892–1952), left-handed pitcher with the Boston Red Sox and Detroit Tigers
 Emil "Dutch" Leonard (1909–1983), right-handed pitcher with the Brooklyn Dodgers, Washington Senators, Philadelphia Phillies, and Chicago Cubs